Cocagne is a Canadian community, formerly part of an eponymous local service district (LSD) and later incorporated rural community, in Kent County, New Brunswick.

History 

It was named after Cockaigne, a mythical paradise in medieval French literature. It is located at the mouth of the Cocagne River on the Northumberland Strait.

William Francis Ganong identified the Mi'kmaq name as Wijulmacadie, referring to a plant found along the river.
In 1866 Cocagne was a farming community with about 65 families: in 1871 the community and surrounding district had a population of 900: in 1898 Cocagne was a sub-port of entry with a population of 250. A post office branch has been located here since 1837.

On 1 January 2023, the rural community of Cocagne amalgamated with all or part of six LSDs to form the new rural community of Beausoleil. The community's name remains in official use, as do those of other communities within the former rural community.

Geography 
The community is located around the mouth of the Cocagne River in Cocagne Bay at the crossroads of Route 535 and Route 134.  Cocagne is also located on the northern terminus of Route 530

Demographics 

Education 
École Blanche-Bourgeois

Notable people 

Auguste Théophile Léger (1852-1923) - New Brunswick politician
Alfred Edmond Bourgeois (1872-1939) - New Brunswick politician, clerk, landlord and merchant.
Allison Dysart (1880-1962) - New Brunswick politician, lawyer and judge
Louis-Prudent-Alexandre Robichaud (1890-1971) - New Brunswick political figure and jurist.
Michel Cormier (b. 1957) - Canadian journalist, lecturer and author.

See also
List of lighthouses in New Brunswick
List of communities in New Brunswick

References

External links

Communities in Kent County, New Brunswick
Rural communities in New Brunswick
Communities in Greater Shediac
Lighthouses in New Brunswick